Charles Ross Mitchell (born June 24, 1962) is an American retired Major League Baseball pitcher who played for the Boston Red Sox. He was drafted by the Red Sox in the fourth round of the 1982 amateur draft. Mitchell played his first professional season with the Elmira Pioneers in 1982 and his last with the Nashville Sounds in 1991.

Mitchell is the brother of fellow former major league pitcher John Mitchell.

References

1962 births
Living people
Boston Red Sox players
Major League Baseball pitchers
Baseball players from Tennessee
Nashville Sounds players
People from Dickson, Tennessee
Columbia Mules players
Elmira Pioneers players
Glens Falls Tigers players
New Britain Red Sox players
Pawtucket Red Sox players
Toledo Mud Hens players
Fortitudo Baseball Bologna players
American expatriate baseball players in Italy